Ljubiša Petruševski (died August 31, 2002) was a Serbian oboist and the Dean of the Faculty of Music in Belgrade.

Education
He was born in Kumanovo, Socialist Republic of Macedonia. He graduated from the Belgrade Music Academy in 1965 as one of the best students, and continued his education in Paris.

Performance career

A prizewinner at many competitions, he played as a soloist and principal oboist of the Belgrade Philharmonic Orchestra, the Belgrade Opera, and the Radio Television of Serbia Symphony Orchestra.

Teaching career

Mr. Petruševski was Professor of Oboe at the Faculty of Music in Belgrade.

He died in Belgrade, Serbia.

References

External links
A record of Ljubiša Petruševski published by PGP RTS
Glas javnosti, September 1, 2002
An Interview With Rastislav Kambaskovic in the New Sound, No. 27

Serbian oboists
Deans (academic)
Academic staff of the University of Arts in Belgrade
University of Arts in Belgrade alumni
2002 deaths
Year of birth missing